Charlotte Green (born 4 May 1956) is a British radio broadcaster and a former continuity announcer and news reader for BBC Radio 4.

After 1988 she specialised in news reading, including reading the news on Radio 4 breakfast Today programme, and reading news items on The News Quiz. The Daily Telegraph described her as "the supreme Radio 4 announcer whose warm yet slightly formal tones were once voted the nation's favourite". Green left Radio 4 in January 2013, and currently reads the classified football results on BBC Radio 5 Live and the World Service Sports Report, succeeding James Alexander Gordon. Her autobiography The News is Read was published by The Robson Press in 2014.

Early life
Green was educated at the independent Haberdashers' Aske's School for Girls in Elstree, followed by the University of Kent, where she gained a first-class BA in English and American Literature and was involved in university radio, before joining the BBC as a studio manager in 1978 at the World Service. She has said that "I wanted to be an actress, but I decided there were too many actresses around, so I joined the BBC."

Broadcasting
After reading out letters for PM and You and Yours she became a continuity announcer in 1985, and then a newsreader in 1988. She was a regular newsreader for the Today programme and the comedy programme The News Quiz, and she has worked on PM and the Shipping Forecast. From 29 October 2005, she joined Chris Evans's Saturday afternoon show on Radio 2 to read phone numbers and announcements.

She was voted the "Most Attractive Female Voice on National Radio" in a poll by the BBC's Radio Times publication in 2002. Green has acknowledged the reliance lonely listeners place in her; her habit of wishing listeners "a peaceful night" led many to send her letters.

In addition to newsreading, Green has been a presenter, including for a programme on church music, a classical music concert series, and a series on World Service news bulletins. She presented Notes & Queries with Clive Anderson on television.

Between 2003 and 2006, Green was unique in her pronunciation of the years between 2001 and 2009. She adopted the 'twenty-oh' method instead of 'two-thousand-and'. This was said to have sparked so many complaints that she reverted to 'two-thousand-and' in 2006.

She played herself in a 2005 radio episode of The Hitchhiker's Guide to the Galaxy, and again played herself in 2008 in Simon Brett's radio detective drama Charles Paris. She has been impersonated by Jan Ravens reading out a double-entendres-filled shipping forecast on the BBC radio comedy show Dead Ringers. She signed a public letter of protest to the BBC Trust regarding cuts to the radio news service in 2007.

Green has on occasions attracted some attention for inopportune giggling during on-air broadcasts. In March 2008, while announcing the death of American film and television writer Abby Mann, Green laughed after what is believed to be the world's earliest recording, played during the preceding item, was described off-air as sounding like "a bee trapped in a bottle".

In a 2012 interview she named the fall of the Berlin Wall as the 'biggest' story that she'd ever read the news for. Green, and her colleague Harriet Cass, left Radio 4, having opted for voluntary redundancy owing to reorganisation. Green's final news bulletin was the 6 o'clock news on Friday 18 January 2013.

Green broadcast on Classic FM between April 2013 and December 2018 presenting Charlotte Green's Great Composers. A keen supporter of Tottenham Hotspur FC, in August 2013 it was announced that Green will follow James Alexander Gordon as the permanent announcer of Sports Report, the Saturday football results programme, on BBC Radio 5 Live. Green's new role, the first ever woman appointed to the post, began on 28 September 2013.

From July 2015, Green was a reader on the BBC Radio 4 panel game Quote... Unquote and featured on the programme's last edition in December 2021.

Personal life
Green is an avid reader who enjoys going to the theatre, concerts and art exhibitions. She is also a Trustee of the University of Kent Development Fund.

Bibliography

Filmography
 Page Eight (2011)

References

External links
 
 
  (RealPlayer)
 

1956 births
Living people
Alumni of the University of Kent
BBC newsreaders and journalists
BBC Radio 4
British radio personalities
Radio and television announcers
People educated at Haberdashers' Girls' School